The 2007 Assen Superbike World Championship round was the fifth round of the 2007 Superbike World Championship. It took place on the weekend of April 27–29, 2007, at the 4.555 km TT Circuit Assen in the Netherlands.

Superbike race 1 classification

Superbike race 2 classification

Supersport classification

References
 Superbike Race 1
 Superbike Race 2
 Supersport Race

Assen Round
Superbike World Championship round
Motorsport competitions in the Netherlands